Abdiel Villa Aguirre (born March 16, 1983 in Mexico City) is a Mexican former professional footballer.

External links
 

1983 births
Living people
Mexican footballers
Atlante F.C. footballers
Tampico Madero F.C. footballers
Club León footballers
C.F. Mérida footballers
Liga MX players
Ascenso MX players
Footballers from Mexico City

Association footballers not categorized by position